Guoco Tower is a mixed-use development skyscraper in Tanjong Pagar of the Downtown Core district of Singapore.
Formerly known as the Tanjong Pagar Centre''', the 65-storey, 1.7 million sq ft skyscraper was developed by GuocoLand and designed by Skidmore, Owings & Merrill. It is the headquarters of Guocoland Limited and is the only skyscraper exempted from the height restriction of 280m. Guoco Tower houses the rooftop Urban Park, the Wallich Residence apartment complex, and a hotel by Sofitel Hotels & Resorts.

The development won the 2014 World Architecture News Mixed-Use Award in the Future Projects category, and was shortlisted for the 2015 World Architecture Festival Commercial Mixed-Use Award in the Future Projects category.

Notable residents
In July 2019, British industrialist and designer James Dyson purchased a   triplex penthouse apartment at the top of the building for £43 million (US$52.8 million). He later sold the flat in October 2020 for £36 million to Chinese American businessman Leo Koguan.

See also
List of tallest buildings in Singapore

References 

Skyscrapers in Singapore
Skyscraper office buildings in Singapore
Office buildings completed in 2016
Downtown Core (Singapore)
2016 establishments in Singapore
Skidmore, Owings & Merrill buildings